Kaizo or Kaizō may refer to:

 Kaizo, genre of difficult platforming games
Kaizo Mario World, ROM hack that spawned the genre
 Kaizō, Japanese general interest magazine published between 1919 and 1955
 Kaizo Hayashi, Japanese film director